Ruilhe is a Portuguese parish, located in the municipality of Braga. The population in 2011 was 1,142, in an area of 2.20 km².

References

Freguesias of Braga